Lorre may refer to:

5438 Lorre, a main-belt asteroid
Chuck Lorre (born 1952), American writer, director, producer and composer
Inger Lorre (born 1963). American singer 
Peter Lorre (1904–1964), Hungarian-American actor

See also
 Loree (disambiguation)